Bellino is a comune (municipality) in the Province of Cuneo in the Italian region Piedmont, located about  southwest of Turin and about  northwest of Cuneo, on the border with France.  It is located in the upper  Varaita Valley.

Bellino borders the following municipalities: Acceglio, Casteldelfino, Elva, Pontechianale, Prazzo, and Saint-Paul-sur-Ubaye (France).   The Pelvo d'Elva peak is located in the communal territory.

References 

Cities and towns in Piedmont